Kemuel ( Qəmūʾēl, "God has risen", "raised by God") is a minor Hebrew masculine name. Three Kemuels are mentioned in the Bible.
 One is mentioned in Genesis 22:21 as the nephew of Abraham, son of Nahor, brother of Bethuel (father of Rebekah).
 The second Kemuel was ruler of the tribe of Ephraim in Numbers 34:24.
 The third was the father of Hashbiah, ruler of the tribe of Levi or Levite, in the Book of Chronicles 27:17.

Kemuel is also an alternate name of the angel Camael.

Book of Genesis people
Book of Numbers people
Books of Chronicles people
Set index articles on Hebrew Bible people
Vayeira

da:Kemuel